Iman Hidayat (born 19 January 1978, in Bandung) is an Indonesian scientist and public official specialized in mycology, microbiology, and plant pathology. Prior his appointment as Acting Head of the Life Sciences Research Organization (Indonesian: Organisasi Riset Ilmu Pengetahuan Hayati, ORIPH), he was a researcher at Research Center for Biomaterial, Indonesian Institutes of Sciences since 1 December 2002. He completed his bachelor degree in Biology at Faculty of Mathematics and Natural Sciences, Padjadjaran University in 2002, and his doctoral degree in Plant Pathology at Faculty of Agriculture, Chiang Mai University in 2009. During his time as researcher, he completed various courses on ascomycetes taxonomy, plant pathological microorganisms, and molecular phylogenetics.

He was appointed as Acting Head of ORIPH since 1 September 2021.

References 

Padjadjaran University alumni
Chiang Mai University alumni
Indonesian academics
Indonesian scientists
1978 births
Living people
People from Bandung